The combativity award is a prize given in road bicycle racing to a stage's or the overall race's most aggressive rider.

References

Cycling jerseys